The following is a list of science fiction podcasts. The list contains podcasts that have been explicitly categorized as science fiction by reliable secondary sources that demonstrate each podcast's notability. The type of release can be either episodic or serial. The delivery of each podcast can vary significantly from a fully scripted audio drama to an entirely improvised skit. Other styles include conversational, interview, or narrated short stories. The contents of each podcast can vary from stories of fiction to nonfiction discussions revolving around fiction in media.

List

See also 

 Science fiction
Science fiction film
Science fiction on television
History of science fiction
Outline of science fiction

References

Further reading 

 Maria Machado, Carmen; Joseph Adams, John (October 2019). The Best American Science Fiction and Fantasy 2019. Houghton Mifflin Harcourt. .
 G. Harwood, Tracy; Grussi, Ben (September 7, 2021). Pioneers in Machinima: The Grassroots of Virtual Production. Vernon Press. .
 Morris, Tee; Terra, Evo; Miceli, Dawn; Domkus, Drew (November 7, 2005). Podcasting For Dummies. Wiley. .

External links 

  on iTunes
 on Player FM
 on Spreaker
 at FictionPodcasts.com

 
Science Fiction